Gods of Youth (original title: Candyland) is a drama film written, directed and produced by Kate Twa. Other working titles were Meth, and Run Rabbit Run.

Plot
Following the next few days of two drug users that meet by coincidence, film school student Paul Moon (Anthony Shim) and meth making Jay King (Joey Pierce) who also deals ecstasy and cocaine, with Briana Clark (Ashley Whillans) (Paul's film school colleague), spiral into self-destructive and havoc wreaking misadventures before tragically succumbing to the paranoia inducing effects of meth.

Cast
James Pizzinato as Terry King
Joey Pierce as Jay King
Anthony Shim as Paul Moon
Ashley Whillans as Briana Clark
Jordana Largy as Niky Jordan
Lynda Boyd as Theresa King
Grace Park as Hanna Moon
William MacDonald as Babydoll
J. R. Bourne as Joe Clark

Production
Preproduction began at least one year before principal photography, as producers and actors interviewed "police officers, addicts, ex-addicts, hospice workers, parole officers, psychiatrists, and councillors" about the attraction and effects of the drug crystal methamphetamine.

The film was then shot over a one-year period, with actors delivering most of their dialogue as improvisation.

Completion financing was secured from Telefilm Canada in 2010, and the final version was completed in January 2011.

Premieres
Film drafts were screened to critical acclaim at the Cinefest Sudbury International Film Festival on September 17, 2008, The Beverly Hills International Film Festival on April 1, 2009, and the Rendezvous with Madness Film Festival (Toronto) on November 10, 2011. Its first major release was its premiere on the Super Channel on February 16, 2012, and was broadcast in rotation until April 15, 2012. It was available on Super Channel's digital demand.

External links
Official Homepage

References

2000 films
2000 drama films
Canadian drama films
English-language Canadian films
Films about drugs
Films about prostitution in Canada
Films shot in Vancouver
Canadian independent films
2000s English-language films
2000s Canadian films